Van der Heide is a Dutch toponymic surname meaning "from the heath". The surnames Van der Heijden and Verheijen have the same origin. People with this surname include:

 Henning van der Heide (ca. 1460 - 1521), German late Gothic sculptor
 Jan van der Heide (died 1959), Dutch tennis player
 Joop van der Heide (1917-1980), Dutch footballer
 Petra van der Heide (born 1971), Dutch harpist
 Rogier van der Heide (born 1970), Dutch lighting designer
 Sandor van der Heide (born 1978), Dutch footballer
 Willy van der Heide, pseudonym of Willem van den Hout (1915-1985), Dutch children's writer
Van der Heiden
 Abraham van der Heiden (1597-1678), Dutch Calvinist minister and controversialist
 Jan van der Heiden (1637-1712), Dutch painter, draughtsman, printmaker, and inventor
 Mischa van der Heiden (born 1971), Dutch DJ
Van Heiden
 Frederick Maurice van Heiden (1821–1900), Russian governor of Finland, son of Lodewijk
 Lodewijk van Heiden (1772–1850), Dutch admiral and Imperial Russian Navy admiral

See also
Van der Heijden
Heiden (surname)

Dutch-language surnames
Surnames of Dutch origin
Dutch toponymic surnames